Somebody Killed Her Husband is a 1978 American comedy–mystery film directed by Lamont Johnson and written by Reginald Rose. It starred Farrah Fawcett and Jeff Bridges. Also in the cast were John Wood, Tammy Grimes and John Glover.

Plot
The film is set in Manhattan, New York City. The plot concerns the efforts of a woman (Fawcett) and her lover (Bridges) to find the murderer of her husband before they are accused of it themselves. The story's climax occurs at the Macy's Thanksgiving Day Parade. Reginald Rose's screenplay was nominated for an Edgar Allan Poe Award.
Strewn throughout this story are clues that implicate real elements of the late President Richard Nixon's activities regarding Watergate and are followed by Bridges' and Fawcett's characters throughout the movie to find out who killed her husband.

Cast
 Farrah Fawcett – Jenny Moore (as Farrah Fawcett-Majors)
 Jeff Bridges – Jerry Green
 John Wood – Ernest Van Santen
 Tammy Grimes – Audrey Van Santen
 John Glover – Herbert Little
 Patricia Elliott – Helene
 Mary McCarty – Flora
 Laurence Guittard – Preston Moore
 Vincent Robert Santa Lucia – Benjamin
 Beeson Carroll – Frank Danziger
 Eddie Lawrence – Other Neighbor
 Arthur Rhyris – Customer
 Jean-Pierre Stewart – Man in Beret
 Terri DuHaime – Lulu's Mother
 Sands Hall – Girl Typist

Production
Martin Poll acquired the script from Reginald Rose in 1976.

Farrah Fawcett had become a star on Charlie's Angels but quit the show. Charlie's Angels producers were suing her. Paramount wanted Fawcett for the lead in Foul Play but were reluctant to hire her with a lawsuit hanging over her head. Poll however signed her to make Somebody Killed Her Husband for a fee of nearly $1 million.

Filming took place in November 1977. The budget was a reported $4.5 million.

Release
The film was not a big hit but Melvin Simon made a $2 million profit by pre-selling the film. He presold it to TV for $3.5 million, sold the foreign rights for $1.8 million, got an advance from Columbia for $1 million and sold TV syndication rights for $850,000.

Soundtrack listing
 Title Theme (03:19)
 Jerry and Jenny (01:33)
 Pretty Jenny (01:22)
 In the Restaurant (02:41)
 Two Lovers (01:26)
 Loving Each Other (01:13)
 First Date (01:19)
 Happiness (01:29)
 Unexpected Murder (01:32)
 Mysterious Days (02:34)
 Doubtful Ernest (01:42)
 Pirate Listener (01:37)
 Second Murder (01:54)
 Secret of Jewels (01:43)
 Jerry's Trick (01:37)
 The Criminal (01:42)
 Fearful Escape (02:03)
 In the True Love (02:25)

See also
 List of American films of 1978

References

External links
 
 
 

1978 films
1970s comedy mystery films
American comedy mystery films
Columbia Pictures films
Films scored by Alex North
Films directed by Lamont Johnson
Films set in New York City
Films shot in New York City
Thanksgiving in films
1978 comedy films
1970s English-language films
1970s American films